Paul-Henri Rebut is a French physicist, working in nuclear fusion.

Biography
Paul-Henri Rebut started his research on nuclear fusion with the Commissariat à l'énergie atomique (CEA) in 1958 after having studied physics at the École polytechnique, Paris and the Ecole des Poudres.

From 1970 to 1973, he contributed to the creation of TFR.

In 1973, he was appointed as head of the design team for JET, at the Culham laboratory, near to Oxford.

In 1979, he was appointed deputy director at JET, in charge of its construction, operation and development.

He was made director of JET in September 1985.
Under his direction, JET made a major contribution to research into nuclear fusion, including the first demonstration in November 1991 of a significant quantity of fusion energy originating from a thermonuclear magnetically confined plasma.

From 1992 to 1994 he became the director of ITER Design Activities, based in San Diego, United States.

Honours
1978 Chevalier de l'Ordre national du Mérite
1984 Chevalier de la Légion d'honneur
2006 Hannes Alfvén Prize

References

External links
 Biography of Paul Henri Rebut at www.naka.jaea.go.jp/ITER

Living people
Nuclear physicists
French physicists
Members of the French Academy of Sciences
Chevaliers of the Légion d'honneur
Knights of the Ordre national du Mérite
Year of birth missing (living people)